Amparo Robles Custodio-Moya (January 21, 1918 – March 31, 1993), known professionally as Chicháy, was a Filipina comedian and actress. Her short and stocky stature, scratchy voice, and prematurely-aged appearance allowed her to portray grandmothers while only in her thirties.

Biography

Early life
She was born in Tondo, Manila, the daughter of a ship steward, Jose Pacifico Custodio and Maria Robles of Bulacan.

Career
She entered  as a teen, joining the "Samahang Antonieta" as a singer with her sister Iluminada. She also appeared as a chorus line dancer at the bodabil shows of Katy de la Cruz. Soon a regular at the bodabil circuit, she received her stage name "Chichay" from Atang de la Rama. The name was a corruption of the Japanese word "Chiisai", meaning "short", in reference to Chichay's own short height and she got famous for her toothless appearance but in reality she still got 2 molars left.

Chichay appeared in her first film, Sampaguita Pictures's Huwag Ka Nang Magtampo, in 1949. She became a star in 1953 after appearing in Gorio and Tekla, opposite Tolindoy. In the next decade, Chichay and Tolindoy became a popular comic duo, often paired together in films.

In 1954, the 36-year-old Chichay was cast as the over-protective grandmother of Fred Montilla's titular role, Bondying, an adaptation of a comic character created by Mars Ravelo. Chichay would make two more Bondying films with Montilla. Remarkably, thirty-five years after the first Bondying film, Chichay would be called upon to play the very same role in the Viva Films remake starring Jimmy Santos.

In 1962, she shared equal billing with other comediennes in Pitong Atsay (1962) as a rebellious canteen servant. It was a box-office riot that a sequel was released, Pitong Atsay Strikes Again (1963). Also she played the comic-villainess, "Alupihan" in Tarsan vs. Tansan (1963) with Dolphy and Vic Vargas.

Chichay remained a contract star with Sampaguita Pictures for almost two decades. After her stint with Sampaguita, she remained in demand as a character actress, often in comic roles. In 1972, she was nominated for a FAMAS Best Supporting Actress award for her role in Bilanguang Puso. She also played support to the country's top actresses — Vilma Santos in Yakapin Mo 'ko, Lalaking Matapang (1980), Nora Aunor in Darling, Buntis Ka na Naman (1978) and Totoo ba ang Tsismis (1980), Sharon Cuneta in Forgive and Forget (1982). She also starred with Fernando Poe Jr. and Susan Roces in No Retreat... No Surrender... Si Kumander (1987).

TV career
Chichay also crossover to television in the 1960s when she played support to Nida Blanca and Nestor de Villa in The Nida-Nestor Show (1969–72) which was actually a variety show. She would provide the laugh antics in between the skits, the sing and dance potions. Other credits include the titular role in Ginang Milyonarya (1973–75) over BBC-2 with Rudy Manlapaz as her clumsy driver. The witchy mom-in-law of Pancho Magalona in Ang Biyenan kong Mangkukulam (1977–78), the old fashioned granny of Bing Pimentel in Ang Lola kong Baduy (1977–78), Nida Blanca's mom in Mana-Mana Yan (1978) the temperamental canteen owner, Aling Farah Pusit in the kiddie show, Kaluskos Musmos (1978–81) and as "La Ching" in 2 + 2 = Gulo (1982–86) with Vic Sotto, Maricel Soriano and Herbert Bautista. Her last known TV show was Chicks for Cats (1987).

Personal life
In 1945, she married Hercules Saenz Moya of Iloilo.

Death
She was active in film until her death in 1993. Among her last roles was as Lola Basyang in the 1986 Regal Films fantasy movie, Mga Kuwento ni Lola Basyang. She was posthumously awarded a star on the Eastwood City Walk of Fame in 2017.

Filmography

1948 - Itanong mo sa Bulaklak [Premiere] 
1949 - Carmencita Mia [Par]
1949 - Kung Sakali ma't Salat [Bayani]
1950 - Huwag ka ng Magtampo! - Sampaguita Pictures
1950 - Kilabot sa Makiling - Sampaguita Pictures
1950 - Mga Baguio Cadets - Sampaguita Pictures
1950 - Huling Patak ng Dugo - Sampaguita Pictures
1950 - Kulog sa Tag-araw - Sampaguita Pictures
1951 - Anghel ng Pag-ibig - Sampaguita Pictures
1952 - Rebecca - Sampaguita Pictures
1952 - Barbaro - Sampaguita Pictures
1952 - Madam X - Sampaguita Pictures
1952 - Kerubin - Sampaguita Pictures
1952 - Buhay Pilipino - Sampaguita Pictures
1953 - Ang Ating Pag-ibig - Sampaguita Pictures
1953 - Gorio at Tekla - Sampaguita Pictures
1953 - Cofradia - Sampaguita Pictures
1953 - Tulisang Pugot - Sampaguita Pictures
1953 - Mister Kasintahan - Sampaguita Pictures
1954 - Ukkala - Sampaguita Pictures
1954 - Nagkita si Kerubin at si Tulisang Pugot - Sampaguita Pictures
1954 - Ang Biyenang Hindi Tumatawa - Sampaguita Pictures
1954 - Anak sa Panalangin - Sampaguita Pictures
1954 - Bondying - Sampaguita Pictures
1955 - Tatay na si Bondying - Sampaguita Pictures
1955 - Artista - Sampaguita Pictures
1955 - Uhaw sa Pag-ibig - Sampaguita Pictures
1955 - Sa Dulo ng Landas - Sampaguita Pictures
1955 - Waldas - Sampaguita Pictures
1955 - Bim Bam Bum - Sampaguita Pictures
1956 - Chavacano - Sampaguita Pictures
1956 - Rodora - Sampaguita Pictures
1957 - Busabos - Sampaguita Pictures
1958 - Zorina [Champion]
1958 - Ang Nobya kong Igorota [Champion]
1959 - Handsome - Sampaguita Pictures
1962 - No Man Is an Island - Gold Coast Pictures
1962 - Pitong Atsay - Dalisay Pictures
1962 - Ang Pinakamalaking Takas ng Pitong Atsay - Dalisay Pictures

Notes

References

External links

1918 births
1993 deaths
Filipino women comedians
People from Tondo, Manila
Actresses from Manila
20th-century Filipino actresses
20th-century comedians